The Charles Darwin University Nursing Museum preserves and promotes nursing heritage in the Northern Territory of Australia. It is located at Charles Darwin University in Darwin.

Establishment

The nursing museum was established in 1987, when the first pre-service nursing program began at Charles Darwin University. Its collection of photographs, artefacts, instruments and memorabilia aims to preserve and promote nursing heritage in the Northern Territory.

Recent history

The museum features two permanent displays and is largely staffed by volunteers.

In 2017 the museum received a grant of $12,300 through the Regional Museums Grants Support Program.

The museum also curates special occasional exhibitions, such as, e.g., "Hospital to Charles Darwin University – a Northern Territory story" (2014), 
"Thirty years of tertiary nursing studies in the Northern Territory" (2013), 
"Nightingale: icon or past image? The Territory’s first nurse" (2011),
"The year of the Nurse: Territory Nurses of Note" (2010).

Catalogue 
A catalogue of the objects in the museum may be found at the collecting bug: CDU Nursing Museum and shows images and details of over 2000 artefacts.

Notable Northern Territory nurses
 Rona Glynn (1936–1965)
 Ruth Heathcock (1901–1995) 
 Ellen Kettle (c.1922–1999)
 Hannah Wood (c. 1827–1903)

References

External links 

 Images from the catalogue of CDU Nursing museum 

Museums in Darwin, Northern Territory
Nursing museums
Medical museums in Australia